Kristoffer Brun (born 7 April 1988) is a Norwegian rower. He competes in lightweight single sculls and in lightweight double sculls along with teammate Are Strandli.

Career
Brun competed at the 2012 Summer Olympics in London in the men's lightweight double sculls with teammate Are Strandli.  They teamed again to win the bronze medal in that event at the 2016 Olympics.

The team are also world champions in their event, at the 2013 World Championships in Chungjiu.  They have also won world championships bronze twice.  At European level, the team of Brun and Strandli have won one silver and three bronzes.

Brun won a gold medal in lightweight single sculls (LM1x) at the 2020 European Rowing Championships.

References

External links
 
 
 
 

Norwegian male rowers
Olympic rowers of Norway
Rowers at the 2012 Summer Olympics
Rowers at the 2016 Summer Olympics
Sportspeople from Bergen
1988 births
Living people
World Rowing Championships medalists for Norway
Olympic bronze medalists for Norway
Olympic medalists in rowing
Medalists at the 2016 Summer Olympics
Rowers at the 2020 Summer Olympics